Zindagi inShort is a 2020 Indian Hindi-language anthology film. It is a Flipkart Video Original that comprises seven short films showcasing different stories, directed by a host of directors: Tahira Kashyap, Punarvasu Naik, Vijayeta Kumar, Rakesh Sain, Gautam Govind Sharma, Smrutika Panigrahi and Vinay Chhawal. The films are produced by Guneet Monga and Achin Jain of Sikhya Entertainment. This series of short films stars Divya Dutta, Neena Gupta, Sanjay Kapoor, Swaroop Sampat, Deepak Dobiryal, Isha Talwar, Bijou Thaangjam amongst others. It was released on Flipkart Video on 19 February 2020.

Overview 
Zindagi inShort is an anthology of short films that portray ordinary life. Every story depicts different stages of life and bittersweet moments that accompany them. These films touch on online romance, the innocence of childhood, the confusion of old age, infidelity, marital rape, a woman owning her role in the family and standing up for yourself when it's the hardest to do so.

List of short films

Cast 
The series features the following casts.

Chhaju Ke Dahi Bhalle 

 Manjot Singh
 Aisha Ahmed

Nano So Phobia 

 Swaroop Sampat
 Nidhi Singh
 Arun Kushwah

Sleeping Partner 

 Sanjay Kapoor
 Divya Dutta
 Jitin Gulati

Pinni 
 Neena Gupta
 Shishir Sharma

Sunny Side Upar 

 Rima Kallingal
 Rytasha Rathore
 Nakuul Mehta

Swaaha 

 Deepak Dobriyal
 Isha Talwar
 Bijou Thaangjam

Thappad 

 Vedika Nawani
 Shafin Patel

Release 
The first look of the film was released on 8 February 2020, after an official announcement made by the producers along with Filpkart Video. After releasing several posters for separate short films, the official trailer was released on 12 February 2020. The anthology film was released on 19 February 2020 through Flipkart Video. After a year of its release, producer Guneet Monga announced that the film will be released through Netflix on 22 February 2021.

Reception 
Ruchi Kaushal of Hindustan Times reviewed "The slice-of-life stories have the ability to bestow you with the gift of smile and not just a slight tug of the upper lip but an ear-to-ear grin." Pratishruti Ganguly of Firstpost rated 4 out of 5 and wrote "For the most part though, Zindagi inShort proves to be worth your time. If you are in the mood to indulge in some web-watching this weekend, this omnibus of short, delectable nuggets of entertainment, sans the pressure of commitment to countless follow-up seasons, will not disappoint." Shubham Kulkarni of Koimoi gave the same rating and stated "Zindagi inShorts is a concept that needs to be promoted. Watch it to see how a story can be told in a limited timeframe without compromising on anything. Watch it to see how varies pallet of stories we have and endorse." Nandini Ramanath of Scroll.in summarised "The emphasis in Zindagi inShort is on feel-good, even when the evidence suggests that this isn't always possible. The spread, which has been produced by Guneet Monga's Sikhya Entertainment for Flipkart Video, consists of slices of life that are mostly sweet with a touch of the savoury and the spicy." Rahul Desai of Film Companion stated "Flipkart Video Originals’ Zindagi inShort is unrestricted by a common theme or, as it's known in producer parlance, a “peg”. At the worst of times, it turns into a gimmick. Each of Zindagi’s seven shorts looks like a story that the maker wants to tell rather than one that must forcibly fit a brief."

References

External links
 Zindagi inShort on Flipkart
 

Indian anthology films
Hindi-language web series
Indian web series
2020 films
Indian short films
Indian romantic drama films
2020 romantic drama films